The Lavasani family (also transliterated as Lavassani) is one of Persia's oldest and most prominent. Most of its members now live in Tehran, but it originated in the Lavasan region; genealogists have traced its history as far back as the early days of the Qajar dynasty. All of the branches of the family are originally from the city of Lavasan. The name Lavasani means "one who is from the city of Lavasan" in Persian.

Although there are many people named Lavasani today, not all of them belong to the mainstream family. The members of the original family nowadays include affluent physicians, surgeons, Generals, architects, designers, artists, judges, translators and professors with broad education in Iran, Europe and the US. Their long lineage stretches back to the 13th century under the Seljuq dynasty.

Lavasan has two parts: Great Lavasan (Lavasan Bozorg) and Little Lavasan (Lavasan Koochak). Currently Great Lavasan is less populated than the Little Lavasan due to influx of new residents moving to Little Lavasan from other cities. Great Lavasan has access from the Jajrood road while the Little Lavasan has access from the Behind the Latian Dam and have different areas including Saboo Bozorg, Saboo Koochak, Tork Mahale, Seied Paiz etc.

Important family members

There are famous individuals among them:
Mehdi Lavasani (born 1947), Iranian footballer
Masoud Lavasani  (born 1979), Iranian journalist and blogger
Omid Lavasani, son of Mohammad Hossein Lavasani, former Iran's ambassador to Canada and Turkey, who was arrested following contested Iranian presidential election, 2009. He was sentenced to six years’ imprisonment by the initial revolutionary court for the charge of “propagation against the regime,” “congregation and mutiny with intent to disrupt internal security,”. He was a web designer of one of the campaigning websites of the reformist candidate Mirhossein Mousavi. He was tried for sending mass email invitations for participating in the protests.
Dr. Mohammad Baqer Lavasani, M.D., Ph.D. – elected senator during the incipient days of the Islamic Republic, who was killed on June 28, 1981, when a bomb exploded in a meeting of the Islamic Republican Party (Hafte Tir bombing). A lot of the high-ranked Iranian officials were killed in the incident including Ayatollah Dr. Mohammad Beheshti. Following the incident, the Farmanieh Street, located in the north of Tehran, where the members of the original family have been residing for centuries, was renamed after them.
Dr. Abbas Lavasani, killed in 1980 during the Iranian Embassy siege in London.

References

Muslim family trees
Iranian families
Surnames